Mateo Emiliano Grasso (born 6 December 1995) is an Argentine professional footballer who plays as a goalkeeper for CAI.

Career
Grasso passed through the youth academies of Talleres, Newell's Old Boys, Boca Juniors and Ferro Carril Oeste. He began his senior career with CAI, as the goalkeeper played twenty-eight times between 2016 and 2017 in Torneo Federal B. In January 2018, Grasso joined Gibraltar Premier Division side Mons Calpe on loan. Grasso, who is of Italian descent, returned to Argentina with Guillermo Brown of Primera B Nacional seven months later. After going unused on the bench five times in 2018–19, he made his debut on 21 April 2019 during a 3–1 loss away to Sarmiento. He left the club in June 2019.

A return to CAI, of Torneo Regional Federal Amateur, was completed in late-2019.

Career statistics
.

References

External links

1995 births
Living people
Footballers from Córdoba, Argentina
Argentine people of Italian descent
Argentine footballers
Association football goalkeepers
Argentine expatriate footballers
Expatriate footballers in Gibraltar
Argentine expatriate sportspeople in Gibraltar
Gibraltar Premier Division players
Primera Nacional players
Comisión de Actividades Infantiles footballers
Mons Calpe S.C. players
Guillermo Brown footballers